On Virtues and Vices is the shortest of the four ethical treatises attributed to Aristotle. The work is now regarded as spurious by scholars and its true origins are uncertain though it was probably created by a member of the peripatetic school.

See also 
 Eudemian Ethics
 Magna Moralia
 Nicomachean Ethics

Notes

References

 Zeller, Eduard (1883). A History of Eclecticism in Greek Philosophy. Longmans, Green, and Co.

External links
 
 De Virtutibus et Vitiis (English Translation, Internet Archive, 1915)
 

Ethics literature
Works by Aristotle